In English, the -er suffix can signify:
an agent noun, e.g., "singer"
a degree of comparison, e.g., "louder"
Oxford "-er", a colloquial and sometimes facetious suffix prevalent at Oxford University from about 1875

English suffixes